Ricardo Otero (born April 15, 1972, in Vega Baja, Puerto Rico) is a retired Major League Baseball player who played outfielder from  to . He played for the Philadelphia Phillies and New York Mets.

References

External links

1972 births
Living people
Binghamton Mets players
Columbia Mets players
Kingsport Mets players
Langosteros de Cancún players
Major League Baseball outfielders
Major League Baseball players from Puerto Rico
Mexican League baseball center fielders
New York Mets players
Norfolk Tides players
People from Vega Baja, Puerto Rico
Philadelphia Phillies players
Pittsfield Mets players
Puerto Rican expatriate baseball players in Mexico
Rochester Red Wings players
Scranton/Wilkes-Barre Red Barons players
St. Lucie Mets players
Zion Pioneerzz players